Padma Shri Ram Nath Shastri, known as the "Father of Dogri" for his pivotal role in the revival and resurgence of the Dogri language, was born on 15 April 1914. 

In 2001, he was awarded the Sahitya Akademi Fellowship, awarded by the Sahitya Akademi, India's National Academy of Letters, the highest literary honour conferred by the Government of India.

Early life and career
Prof. Shastri's father, Vaid Gauri Shankar, was an Ayurvedic doctor and originally belonged to a small village Marhi in Reasi tehsil of Udhampur district (now Reasi district). For better prospects, he moved to Jammu. Initially, he wanted Ram Nath to adopt the same profession and instructed him to learn Sanskrit. All ancient scriptures being in Sanskrit, it would be immensely helpful as an Ayurvedic doctor. He joined Ranbir Sanskrit Pathshala at the Ranbir High School.  After which, he did post graduation in Sanskrit and Prabhakar in Hindi.  He started his career as a high school Sanskrit teacher for 5 years and later he became a college lecturer.

In 1944, on the day of Basant Panchami, along with a few friends, he established the Dogri Sanstha. Every upcoming writer in the Dogri language would first enroll himself in the Sanstha. He also edited the Dogri literary periodical Nami Chetna of the Sanstha. In 1970, on the occasion of the Silver Jubilee Celebration of Dogri Sanstha, he edited the RAJAT JAYANTI GRANTH in which research oriented articles on Dogra life, art, culture, literature and history were put together.

In 1970, he retired as a professor in the J&K State Education Department. From 1970 to 1975 he has been a Senior Fellow of Dogri in the University of Jammu.

From 1977 to 1985, as Chief Editor in J&K Cultural Academy he edited the 'Dogri – Dogri Dictionary′.

He died on 8 March 2009, in Jemmu.

Books
 Dharti Da Rin 
 Badnami Di Chhan (1976)
 Talkhiyan 
 Kalamkaar Charan Singh 
 Naman Gran- Dogri Play (with co-authors Dinu Bhai Pant and Ram Kumar Abrol)
 Bawa Jitto 
 Jhakdian Kiran 
 Duggar De Lok Nayak

Translations
 Six Upanishads
 Bhartrharis's NEETI SHATAK
 Shudraka's Mricchakatikam (1989)
 Four short plays of BHASA
 Rabindranath Tagore's Gitanjali, Balidan, Malini and Dakghar
 Mahatama Gandhi's autobiography –My experiments with Truth
 Vinoda Bhave's Gita Pravachan
 C.Rajagopalachari's Ramayana
 Dharamveer Bharati's Andha Yug
 Gorki's Lower Depths

Honors and awards
 2001—59th Sahitya Akademi Fellowship-highest literary honour conferred by the Government of India for his contribution to Dogri Language
 1990—Padma Shri Award, India's fourth highest civilian honour for Literature & Education
 1994—D.Litt. (Honoris Causa) from University of Jammu
 1977—Sahitya Akademi Award for his short story collection – Badnami Di Chaan
 1991—State Akademi Award for the collection of Dogri gazals – TALKHIYAN
 1989—Sahitya Akademi Translation Prize in 1989 for the Dogri Translation of the Sanskrit Drama, Mrichakatika   as Mitti Di Gaddi.
 1981—State Academy Award for his Dogri prose work – Duggar De Lok Nayak.

References

External links
seminar on life of Prof. Ram Nath Shastri commences, December 9, 2010
Jammu Writers & Authors
Two decades of Dogri literature --- Shivanath

1914 births
2009 deaths
Dogri language
Indian male short story writers
Recipients of the Sahitya Akademi Award in Dogri
Recipients of the Sahitya Akademi Fellowship
Recipients of the Padma Shri in literature & education
Translators from Sanskrit
People from Reasi district
20th-century Indian poets
20th-century Indian translators
20th-century Indian short story writers
Poets from Jammu and Kashmir
Indian male poets
20th-century Indian dramatists and playwrights
Indian male dramatists and playwrights
Dramatists and playwrights from Jammu and Kashmir
20th-century Indian male writers
Academic staff of the University of Jammu
Recipients of the Sahitya Akademi Prize for Translation